Robert M. Speer (born February 10, 1956) is a retired military officer and American businessman who manages a consulting practice. In addition, he serves on several boards, including as chairman of the Code of Support Foundation, a military services organization. Formerly, he served as Acting United States Secretary of the Army from January 20, 2017 to August 2, 2017.

Early life and education
He attended University of Notre Dame (BA, Accounting), Indiana University (MBA, Information Systems) and Industrial College of the Armed Forces of National Defense University (MS, National Resource Strategy). He was commissioned in the Army through the Reserve Officers' Training Corps (ROTC).

Career
Speer served 28 years in the U. S. Army having been Battalion Commander in the 82nd Airborne Division and Brigade Level Command of a Defense Agency operation. In 2004, Robert Speer was tapped to establish financial controls in Iraq for $18.6 billion appropriated for reconstruction projects during the occupation of Iraq. He then served as a managing director for PricewaterhouseCoopers where he led their Defense and Army business. In October 2009, he was designated the Principal Deputy Assistant Secretary of the Army (Financial Management and Comptroller), and in December 2014, Assistant Secretary of the Army for Financial Management and Comptroller. In January, 2017, Speer was one of only six senior Pentagon officials to be asked to stay through the transition to President Trump's administration.

Personal life
Speer currently resides in Virginia. He and his wife have four adult children and two grandchildren.

References

External links

1956 births
Indiana University alumni
Living people
People from Monterey County, California
United States Army officers
United States Department of Defense officials
University of Notre Dame alumni